Lovey Mary is a 1903 novel by American writer Alice Hegan Rice, which is a sequel to her 1901 novel Mrs. Wiggs of the Cabbage Patch. It is about an orphaned girl named Lovey Mary who runs away from her orphanage and is taken in by a woman named Mrs. Wiggs in an area of urbanized Kentucky known as the Cabbage Patch, an area which was inspired by Rice's personal experiences growing up in Kentucky. The novel is largely dramatic, however it features comic relief through jokes and sarcasm among those that Lovey Mary meets in the Cabbage Patch.

While not as successful as Mrs. Wiggs of the Cabbage Patch, Rice's 1903 novel was well-enough received to be both dramatized and adapted into a film in 1904 and 1926 respectively.

Publication 
The vast majority of the copies of Rice's novel were published in 1903, while there were also re-prints in years such as 1907. In 1903, the novel was published mainly in New York City by the Century Company, yet other publishing locations and companies such as The Montreal News Company in Montreal, William Briggs in Toronto, and Hodder & Stoughton in London published the novel as well.

Adaptations 
In 1904, the novel was dramatized, along with Mrs. Wiggs of the Cabbage Patch, by Anne Crawford Flexner, and adapted into a Metro-Goldwyn-Mayer Pictures film in 1926, directed by King Baggot and starring Bessie Love as Lovey Mary. Only 6 of the 7 original reels of film for this adaptation survive until today, and these exist in the MGM preservation.

References 

1903 American novels
Novels set in Kentucky
The Century Company books